The Luxembourg women's national under-18 basketball team is a national basketball team of Luxembourg, administered by the Luxembourg Basketball Federation.
It represents the country in women's international under-18 basketball competitions.

The team won a gold medal at the 2009 FIBA Europe Under-18 Championship for Women Division C.

See also
Luxembourg women's national basketball team
Luxembourg women's national under-16 basketball team
Luxembourg men's national under-18 basketball team

References

External links
Archived records of Luxembourg team participations

Basketball in Luxembourg
Basketball teams in Luxembourg
Women's national under-18 basketball teams
Basketball